Gustavus Swan (also known as Gustave) (July 15, 1787 – February 6, 1860) was a lawyer and banker from the U.S. state of Ohio who was appointed to fill a vacancy on the Ohio Supreme Court in 1829-1830.

Biography

Swan was born in Sharon, New Hampshire in 1787 to John and Sarah Swan. He attended local schools and private academies in the area, trading bookkeeping for tuition and board. He worked as an assistant in a bank while studying law at night. In 1810, he moved to Ohio.

Swan lived in Marietta for a year and worked in a law office before being admitted to the bar in 1811. He moved to Franklinton, in hopes it would become the state capital. In 1814, he moved to Columbus. He also served in the Fourth Brigade of the Second Division of the Ohio Militia during the War of 1812.

Swan was elected to the Ohio House of Representatives in 1812 and 1817 for one year terms. In between, he had a law practice, doing title work on claims in the Virginia Military District. He also was Franklin County prosecuting attorney 1821-1823.

On October 1, 1823, Ohio Governor Jeremiah Morrow appointed Swan as president judge of the Court of Common Pleas for the sixth circuit, to fill a vacancy caused by the death of the sitting judge. He was appointed to a full seven-year term in February 1824 by the legislature.

Swan resigned from the sixth circuit on July 9, 1829, when Governor Allen Trimble appointed him to fill the vacancy on the Ohio Supreme Court caused by the death of Charles Robert Sherman. He served until February 1830, when the legislature appointed a permanent replacement. He then continued in private practice in Columbus until 1844, when he retired from law.

May 21, 1840, Governor Wilson Shannon appointed Swan a Canal Fund Commissioner. He was re-appointed in 1842.

From 1823-1842, Swan served as president of the Franklin Bank of Columbus. In 1845, the General Assembly appointed him to the Board of Control of the Bank of Ohio. He was appointed the first president of the State Bank of Ohio and held that position until 1854.

Swan married Amelia Aldrich in Hillsboro, New Hampshire in 1819. They had four children. Swan died in Columbus February 6, 1860.

References

1787 births
1860 deaths
Members of the Ohio House of Representatives
Justices of the Ohio Supreme Court
Politicians from Columbus, Ohio
County district attorneys in Ohio
American militiamen in the War of 1812
Lawyers from Columbus, Ohio
19th-century American politicians
19th-century American judges
19th-century American lawyers